Cinema Research Corporation (CRC) was an American special effects company in Hollywood, California, and one of the first to produce effects, trailers, opticals, and titles under one roof. The company was the special effects industry leader for decades, until Industrial Light and Magic surpassed them in the late 1980s. In 1990, CRC began to concentrate its efforts on titles and opticals, and became the industry leader in those categories, by providing the titles and opticals for over 400 productions in the decade before the CEO's passing in 2000.

History
Cinema Research Corporation was founded in 1953 by Charles Pati from Brooklyn, New York. He moved to California at the age of 40 with the dream of getting involved with the film industry in Hollywood. By 1954, he had his first title, The Black Pirates, for which he created the special effects. By the end of that decade, he owned the largest special effects studio in Hollywood. His company, Cinema Research Corporation did titles, opticals, trailers, and special effects.

The Compound was located at 6860 Lexington Avenue, in Hollywood, California. It took up a square block. CRC was an early pioneer in the special effects community, and evolved into all areas of film related to pre- and post-production, until Charlie Pati's death in 2000 at 86 years old. During its heyday, his company was involved in over 670 full-length Hollywood movies. Charles Pati's passing ended Cinema Research Corporation, however others have used a DBA (Doing Business As) CRC, but none succeeded, and all are now defunct.

Credits
1954-2000: 617 film credits for titles, trailers and/or optical effects credited to Cinema Research Corporation, and 61 films in which Cinema Research Corporation did the special effects.

44th Academy Awards Oscar winner
1971: To Producers Service Corporation and Consolidated Film Industries; and to Cinema Research Corporation and Research Products, Inc. for the engineering and implementation of fully automated blow-up motion picture printing systems, was presented the: Technical Achievement Award (Class III)

See also 
 Consolidated Film Industries

References

External links 
Company credits for The Black Pirates

Special effects companies